The University of Texas Solar Vehicles Team (UTSVT) is a student-driven effort to design, build, test, and race solar vehicles for the purpose of reinforcing skills learned in the classroom, raising awareness of solar power, and bringing solar power closer to practicality. To accomplish this task, a multidisciplinary group of students from various disciplines in the Cockrell School of Engineering, and from other schools across the University of Texas, such as the College of Liberal Arts and the College of Natural Sciences come together to design and construct the most efficient vehicle as possible.

The vehicles are completely powered by the sun and are entered in competitions against universities from across the United States and internationally. The team serves as the host for American Solar Challenge (ASC) and Formula Sun Grand Prix (FSGP). In addition to participating in races, the team participates in outreach events to educate the general public and K-12 students about the excitement of STEM careers and alternative energy.

Vehicles

Texas Native Sun I 
UT's first solar car was Texas Native Sun, built with a graphite and epoxy composite monocoque body and nickel-hydrogen batteries. A high-density permanent magnet electric motor powered its continuously variable transmission. It competed in three races—Sunrayce 1990 and 1993, and the California Clean Air Race 1991 where it placed second out of 30 teams.

Texas Native Sun II 
UT's second solar car, Texas Native Sun II, was a two-seater and larger than the first, weighing . It featured a bespoke electric hub motor and controller supplied by lead-acid batteries. Texas Native Sun II raced in the Tour de Sol in 1996 placing fourth in its class.

Solstice 
The team's third solar car was named Solstice, which was built for Sunrayce 1999 but never completed.

Solar Steer 
With construction beginning in 2004, Solar Steer was UT's first vehicle to have lithium-ion batteries and a carbon fiber body. It was completed in 2005 at a cost of $90,000.

It was entered in the 2005 North American Solar Challenge but could not compete due to poor weather and a steering malfunction. The team also entered Solar Steer into the North American Solar Challenge for 2006.

Samsung Solorean 
Design began in early 2007 for UTSVT's next car, to be named after their sponsor, Samsung, and the DeLorean in Back to the Future. The chassis is chromoly tubular steel supporting the carbon fiber body. The battery pack consists of 598 LG 18650 lithium ion cells. A National Instruments CompactRIO controls all electrical subsystems. The motor is a New Generation brushless permanent magnet motor that can provide  of power at 95% efficiency while weighing .

UTSVT completed Solorean June 2008, just too late to compete in the North American Solar Challenge that summer. Samsung Solorean competed in the 2009 and 2010 FSGP and 2010 American Solar Challenge.

TexSun 
TexSun was completed spring 2013 at a cost of $140,000, $50,000 of which was donated by Circuit of the Americas. The three-wheeled vehicle has an aluminum space-frame chassis, carbon fiber body, and uses an Enertrac 602 hub motor to power the rear wheel. The batteries are lithium iron phosphate.

TexSun placed sixth at the 2013 Formula Sun Grand Prix held at Circuit of the Americas for the first time. It also participated in the 2015 and 2016 FSGPs, and competed for the last time at the 2017 FSGP the team hosted.

BeVolt 
Production of BeVolt (portmanteau of Bevo and volt) began in the spring semester of 2017 to be race-ready for Formula Sun Grand Prix 2018. UTSVT again targeted summer 2019 for completion. This car fell behind schedule and was ultimately cancelled in 2020 following multiple manufacturing difficulties and the COVID-19 pandemic. BeVolt was budgeted at $180,000.

Lonestar 
Planning of a new car began during the fall 2020 semester, with a goal to race during 2022. UTSVT designed their latest car, Lonestar, to weigh  and have a solar array of 260 cells that produces . Design work, finished in December 2020, was done predominantly virtually, with students spread far due to the COVID-19 pandemic. This also impacted manufacturing due to limited hours at J. J. Pickle Research Campus and some team members still working remotely.

The team brought Lonestar to the 2022 FSGP but could not race after technical inspection revealed an issue with the battery management system. The team will utilize the car as a test bed for the next car's development, which started summer 2022.

Team leads
UTSVT's longtime faculty advisor is Dr. Gary A. Hallock, who has provided guidance since 2004. The  team is led by captain Rishi Ponnekanti, chief engineer Clark Poon, mechanical lead Walter Stark, and electrical lead Hannah Lee.

See also
List of solar car teams

References

Further reading

External links

Solar car racing
Solar Vehicles Team